Nash County Courthouse is a historic courthouse located at Nashville, Nash County, North Carolina.  It was built in 1921, and is a two-story, rectangular, brick building in the Colonial Revival style.  It has a "T"-shaped in plan, with the temple-form main block flanked by small brick wings. The interior was remodeled in 1974. An expansion to the courthouse was started in 2017 and finished in 2018.

It was added to the National Register of Historic Places in 1979. It is located in the Nashville Historic District.

References

County courthouses in North Carolina
Courthouses on the National Register of Historic Places in North Carolina
Colonial Revival architecture in North Carolina
Government buildings completed in 1921
Buildings and structures in Nash County, North Carolina
National Register of Historic Places in Nash County, North Carolina
Historic district contributing properties in North Carolina